Aemilia is a genus of tiger moths in the family Erebidae described by William Forsell Kirby in 1892. It was initially named Ameles, but this name properly refers to a praying mantis genus.

A group of species closely related to the red-banded aemilia ("A." ambigua) was formerly placed in the genus (though only uneasily so). The species has recently been moved to the revalidated genus Pseudohemihyalea.

Selected species

Species of Aemilia include:
 Aemilia affinis (Rothschild, 1909)
 Aemilia asignata Hampson, 1901
 Aemilia castanea Joicey & Talbot, 1916
 Aemilia crassa (Walker, [1865])
 Aemilia fanum (Druce, 1900)
 Aemilia melanchra Schaus, 1905
 Aemilia mincosa (Druce, 1906)
 Aemilia ockendeni (Rothschild, 1909)
 Aemilia pagana (Schaus, 1894)
 Aemilia peropaca (Seitz, 1920)
 Aemilia rubriplaga (Walker, 1855)
 Aemilia tabaconas (Joicey & Talbot, 1916)
 Aemilia testudo Hampson, 1901

Footnotes

References

Schmidt, B. Christian. (2009). "Revision of the "Aemilia" ambigua (Strecker) species-group (Noctuidae, Arctiinae)". ZooKeys. 9: 63–78. 
Vincent, Benoît & Laguerre, Michel. (2014). "Catalogue of the Neotropical Arctiini Leach, [1815] (except Ctenuchina Kirby, 1837 and Euchromiina Butler, 1876) (Insecta, Lepidoptera, Erebidae, Arctiinae)". Zoosystema. 36 (2): 380.

External links

Phaegopterina
Moth genera